Turbonilla brasiliensis is a species of sea snail, a marine gastropod mollusk in the family Pyramidellidae, the pyrams and their allies.

Description
The shell grows to a length of 9.5 mm.

Distribution
This species occurs in the Atlantic Ocean off Brazil at depths between 48 m and 56 m.

References

 Ihering, H. von. 1907. Les Mollusques fossiles du Tertiare et du Crétacé Supérieur de l'Argentine. Anales del Museo Nacional de Buenos Aires (3)7: xiii + 611 pp., 18 pls.

External links
 To Encyclopedia of Life
 To World Register of Marine Species

brasiliensis
Gastropods described in 1902